Hyytiäinen is a Finnish surname. Notable people with the surname include:

 Veikko Hyytiäinen (1919–2000), Finnish lawyer and politician
 Toivo Hyytiäinen (1925–1978), Finnish athlete
 Eija Hyytiäinen (born 1961), Finnish cross country skier

Finnish-language surnames